The 2021 NBL1 West season was the inaugural season of the NBL1 West. After 32 years known as the State Basketball League (SBL), the league was rebranded under the NBL1 banner for 2021. The regular season began on Friday 16 April and ended on Saturday 14 August. The finals began on Friday 20 August and concluded with the women's grand final on Friday 3 September and the men's grand final on Saturday 4 September.

The NBL1 National Finals, which was set to take place in Melbourne, was cancelled on 13 August 2021 due to the COVID-19 pandemic. They were originally scheduled for Friday 10 September to Sunday 12 September.

Regular season
In October 2020, Basketball Western Australia and the National Basketball League (NBL) announced a new partnership to bring NBL1 to Western Australia in 2021, with NBL1 replacing the SBL. The SBL was officially renamed NBL1 West and became the west conference of NBL1.

Following the cancellation of the 2020 SBL season due to the COVID-19 pandemic, the 2021 season marked the 32nd season in the SBL / NBL1 West history.

Seventeen rounds of competition was scheduled, with the regular season beginning on Friday 16 April. Round 2 (Anzac Round), Round 3 and Round 12 were not played (with games later rescheduled where possible) due to COVID-19 restrictions in Perth. In continuing tradition, there was Women's Round (4) and Mental Health Awareness Round (10), to go with the inclusion of Indigenous Round (13).

Standings

Men's ladder

Women's ladder

Finals
The finals began on Friday 20 August and consisted of four rounds. The finals concluded with the women's grand final on Friday 3 September and the men's grand final on Saturday 4 September.

Men's bracket

Women's bracket

Awards

Player of the Week

Coach of the Month

Statistics leaders
Stats as of the end of the regular season

Regular season
 Men's Most Valuable Player: Nic Pozoglou (Cockburn Cougars)
 Women's Most Valuable Player: Alexandra Sharp (Willetton Tigers)
 Men's Coach of the Year: Adam Nener (Willetton Tigers)
 Women's Coach of the Year: Blake Srdarev (East Perth Eagles)
 Men's Defensive Player of the Year: Nic Pozoglou (Cockburn Cougars)
 Women's Defensive Player of the Year: Emma Gandini (Willetton Tigers)
 Men's Youth Player of the Year: Rowan Mackenzie (Lakeside Lightning)
 Women's Youth Player of the Year: Jewel Williams (Kalamunda Eastern Suns)
 Men's Leading Scorer: Jay Bowie (Lakeside Lightning)
 Women's Leading Scorer: Samantha Lubcke (Willetton Tigers)
 Men's Leading Rebounder: Jarrad Prue (Lakeside Lightning)
 Women's Leading Rebounder: Mary Goulding (East Perth Eagles)
 Men's Golden Hands: Scott Machado (Mandurah Magic)
 Women's Golden Hands: Casey Mihovilovich (Mandurah Magic)
 All-NBL1 West Men's 1st Team:
 Scott Machado (Mandurah Magic)
 Nic Pozoglou (Cockburn Cougars)
 Jay Bowie (Lakeside Lightning)
 Mathiang Muo (Geraldton Buccaneers)
 Louis Timms (Perth Redbacks)
 All-NBL1 West Women's 1st Team:
 Stacey Barr (Warwick Senators)
 Mary Goulding (East Perth Eagles)
 Samantha Lubcke (Willetton Tigers)
 Alexandra Sharp (Willetton Tigers)
 Kayla Steindl (Joondalup Wolves)

Finals
 Men's Grand Final MVP: Andrew Ferguson (Perry Lakes Hawks)
 Women's Grand Final MVP: Alexandra Sharp (Willetton Tigers)

References

External links

 2021 fixtures
 "10 Players to Watch in NBL1 West" at nbl1.com.au
 "2021 NBL1 West Grand Final match-up and preview" at australiabasket.com
 Women's grand final preview
 Men's grand final preview
 Women's grand final highlights
 Men's grand final highlights
 Women's grand final scoresheet
 Men's grand final scoresheet

2021
2020–21 in Australian basketball
2021–22 in Australian basketball